Stellaria irrigua is a species of flowering plant in the family Caryophyllaceae known by the common names umbrella starwort and umbellate starwort. It is native to western North America from Alaska and north-western Canada to the south-western United States, as well as parts of Asia, including Siberia. It grows in subalpine and alpine climates in mountain forests and riverbanks. It is a rhizomatous perennial herb producing a slender prostrate stem up to about 20 centimeters long, sometimes forming clumps or mats. The stem is lined with pairs of oval leaves each up to about 2 centimeters long. The inflorescence is an umbel-shaped array of several flowers each on an arching or erect pedicels. The flower has five pointed green sepals each no more than 3 millimeters long. There are occasionally tiny white petals within the calyx of sepals, but these are generally absent.

References

External links
Jepson Manual Treatment
Flora of North America
Photo gallery

irrigua
Flora of Subarctic America
Flora of Western Canada
Flora of the Northwestern United States
Flora of the Southwestern United States
Flora of the South-Central United States
Flora without expected TNC conservation status
Taxa named by Alexander von Bunge